Form factor or form-factor may refer to:

Manufacturing 
 Form factor (design), an aspect of design which defines and prescribes the size, shape, and other physical specifications of hardware components, particularly in electronics and electronic packaging
 Form factor (mobile phones)
 Computer form factor, the specifications of computer motherboards
 Hard disk drive form factor
 FormFactor (company), a semiconductor test and measurement company,  acquired Cascade Microtech in 2016

Scattering theory 
 Form factor (quantum field theory), a semi-empirical formula used in effective quantum field theories
 Atomic form factor, or atomic scattering factor, a measure of the amplitude of a wave scattered from an isolated atom
 Electric form factor, the Fourier transform of electric charge distribution in space
 Magnetic form factor, the Fourier transform of an electric current distribution in space

Other sciences 
 Form factor (electronics), characterizing the functional form of oscillating signals
 Form factor (radiative transfer) or view factor, the proportion of energy transmitted by that object which can be transferred to another object
 Form factor in timber metrics, referring to tree shape

See also 
Structure factor